Argogorytes mystaceus is a species of solitary wasp in the family Crabronidae.

Distribution
This species has a Palearctic distribution occurring in most European countries from Ireland in the west  and east to Siberia, Japan, Korea, China; south to Turkey.

Habitat

Description
These medium-sized wasps have a black abdomen with a few yellow stripes and no petiole. In males antennae are very long. Mesothorax and scutellum are black. Legs are pale yellowish brown, with a black base.

Biology
Females of Argogorytes mystaceus usually visit Apiaceae flowers, wood spurge and honeydew on sweet chestnut leaves. Males are known to be pollinator of the flowers of fly orchids (mainly Ophrys insectifera). The males of this species try to copulate (pseudocopulation) with these specialized flowers, that mimic (pouyannian mimicry) the shape and the scent of the females, with the purpose of deceiving them and thereby pollinate the flowers.

These solitary wasps nest in soil in dry banks. Larvae feed on larvae of small leafhoppers and spittlebugs (mainly Philaenus and Aphrophora species). They fly in one generation from mid-May to mid-August. Among their natural enemies there are parasitoid wasps (especially Ichneumonidae larvae) and nest parasites (Nysson spinosus).

References

External links
 Argogorytes mystaceus images at Consortium for the Barcode of Life
 INPN

Crabronidae
Palearctic insects
Hymenoptera of Asia
Hymenoptera of Europe
Insects described in 1761
Taxa named by Carl Linnaeus